Alberto Cavallero (14 September 1900 – 7 October 1968) was an Italian long-distance runner.

Biography
He competed in the marathon at the 1924 Summer Olympics, but he did not finish the race. He had one cap for the national team in 1924. In his native city, Genoa, is sailed a race named after him.

See also
Italy at the 1924 Summer Olympics

References

External links
 

1900 births
1968 deaths
Athletes (track and field) at the 1924 Summer Olympics
Italian male long-distance runners
Italian male marathon runners
Olympic athletes of Italy